Jan Opaliński (1546 – 1597/98) was a Polish nobleman of Łodzia coat of arms. Castellan of Rogozin, bibliophile, bought Sieraków in 1591.

Son of Jan Opaliński (1519–1561) and Anna Gostynska, married to Barbara z Ostroroga Lwowska (of Nałęcz coat-of-arms), in 1580. Father of Jan Opaliński (1581–1637) and Piotr Opaliński (1586–1624), as well as daughters (Zofia and Anna).

1546 births
1590s deaths
Polish Roman Catholics
Jan 1546